Jacques Joel Tsimi or Joel Tsimi (born January 9, 1984) is a Cameroonian footballer who currently plays as defender for Persisam Putra Samarinda.

References

External links 
 Profile at Liga Indonesia Official Site

1984 births
Living people
Cameroonian footballers
Expatriate footballers in Indonesia
Liga 1 (Indonesia) players
Sriwijaya F.C. players
Persisam Putra Samarinda players
PSPS Pekanbaru players
Association football defenders